A manual pulse generator (MPG) is a device for generating electrical pulses (short bursts of low current) in electronic systems under the control of a human operator (manually), as opposed to the pulses automatically generated by software. MPGs are used on computer numerically controlled (CNC) machine tools, on some microscopes, and on other devices that use precise component positioning. A typical MPG consists of a rotating knob that generates pulses that are sent to an equipment controller.  The controller will then move the piece of equipment a predetermined distance for each pulse. 

For example, the handwheel of a typical CNC control will move any of the slides of the machine by one minimum increment, such as 1 micrometre or 1 ten-thousandth of an inch, for each pulse, and the handwheel will give one ratchet-like click or other haptic click to confirm to the user that a single increment occurred. Several selector switches control the handwheel's output: one allows each of the machine's axes (X, Y, Z, and so on) to be selected in turn; another shifts through several ranges of output, so that one click of the wheel is either one minimum increment, 10 times that, or 100 times that. 

The modern trend in CNC user interface design is to place the MPG on a handheld pendant that the operator can carry, making it conveniently independent from the main control panel, just as a game controller is independent from the video game console. 

Computing input devices